Žigmund "Ziggy" Pálffy (born 5 May 1972) is a Slovak former professional ice hockey player.  Along with his English nickname, he was nicknamed "Žigo" in Slovak.

One of the most talented wingers, Pálffy played in the NHL for 12-years with the New York Islanders, Los Angeles Kings, and Pittsburgh Penguins between 1993 and 2006. He announced his retirement in January 2006, and his comeback from retirement in the summer of 2007. Pálffy signed a contract to play for his boyhood club HK 36 Skalica in the 2007–08 season and continued to do so until the end of his career. He also retracted his decision from 2005 never to play for the Slovak national team again by participating at the 2010 Winter Olympics in Vancouver, where he was also the flagbearer. In July 2013, he announced his definite retirement. Pálffy was inducted into the IIHF Hall of Fame in 2019.

Playing career

New York Islanders
After a solid season in his native Czechoslovakia and an impressive stint with the Czechoslovakia national team in the 1991 World Junior Ice Hockey Championships, Pálffy was drafted by the New York Islanders in the second round of the 1991 NHL Draft, 26th overall. After two more years in Slovakia, Pálffy came to North America for the 1993–94 season. He spent the majority of the 1993–94 season in the International Hockey League (IHL) with the Salt Lake Golden Eagles, while also making his NHL debut with the Islanders, appearing in five games, though he did not earn a single point. The following season, 1994–95, he split the year between the Islanders and the Denver Grizzlies of the IHL.

The 1995–96 NHL season saw Pálffy break out as an offensive scorer. In his first game of 1995–96, his team went down one goal but Pálffy would score two goals to lead New York to a 2–1 win over the Florida Panthers. He also scored 87 points in 81 games and quickly became the star of the Islanders franchise. The following two seasons were much the same for Pálffy, scoring 90 and 87 points respectively. During the 1998–99 season, Pálffy was limited to only 50 games but still played solidly, scoring 50 points.

Los Angeles Kings
After the season, the Islanders, facing financial woes, traded him and Bryan Smolinski to the Los Angeles Kings in a deal that saw Olli Jokinen, Josh Green, Mathieu Biron and a first-round draft pick go to the Islanders.

With the Kings, Pálffy continued his strong play, often being paired with fellow Slovak Jozef Stümpel and Canadian superstar Luc Robitaille. Injuries, specifically his shoulder, began to limit Pálffy's playing time. During the 2003–04 season, Pálffy's nagging shoulder kept him out of action for the majority of the season.

Pittsburgh Penguins and retirement
After the 2003–04 season, the Kings tried to re-sign Pálffy, but when Pálffy had a phone call with Pittsburgh Penguins owner Mario Lemieux and gave him his word that he would sign with the Penguins, that ended all negotiations with the Kings. Shortly after the 2004–05 NHL lockout, he signed with the Penguins for three years and US$13.5 million.

After playing 42 games with the Penguins during the 2005–06 season, Pálffy abruptly retired from professional hockey. On January 18, 2006, then-Penguins general manager Craig Patrick told reporters Pálffy told him he was retiring due to a lingering shoulder injury. Pálffy completed his career with 329 goals and 384 assists for 713 points in 684 games over 12 NHL seasons.

HK 36 Skalica and second retirement
Pálffy announced his comeback from retirement in the summer of 2007, and signed a contract to play for his hometown club of HK 36 Skalica for the entire 2007–08 season. He became the most productive player of the regular season in the Slovak Extraliga, where he led four seasons in points.

In July 2013, before the start of the 2013–14 season, Pálffy formally announced his retirement from professional hockey. He said he was old enough and did not feel like playing and traveling with the team after so many years, but also that he was going to miss the game of hockey since he lived for it for almost 40 years.

International play

Pálffy has represented Slovakia and Czechoslovakia in international competitions, winning a gold medal with Slovakia in the 2002 after he had assisted on Peter Bondra's tournament-winning goal 100 seconds to go in the third period. Following the 2005 World Championships in Austria, Pálffy announced his retirement from the Slovak national team.

Five years later, Pálffy would broke his retirement, as he is named to the Slovak national team for the 2010 Winter Olympics in Vancouver and recorded three assists with the team for a total of three points in seven games.

Career statistics

Regular season and playoffs

International statistics

Awards and honours

Transactions
 June 9, 1991 – Drafted 26th overall in the 1991 NHL Entry Draft by the New York Islanders.
 June 19, 1999 – Traded to the Los Angeles Kings with Bryan Smolinski, Marcel Cousineau & a 1999 4th round pick (Daniel Johansson) for Olli Jokinen, Josh Green, Mathieu Biron & a 1999 1st round pick (Taylor Pyatt).
 September 15, 2004 – Signed to a lockout contract by SK Slavia Prague.
 October 7, 2004 – Signed to a lockout contract by HK 36 Skalica.
 November 16, 2004 – Signed to a lockout contract by SK Slavia Praha.
 August 6, 2005 – Signed by the Pittsburgh Penguins.
 January 18, 2006 – Announced his retirement.
 July 19, 2007 – Signed by HK 36 Skalica (comeback).
 September 15, 2011 – Re-signed by HK 36 Skalica.
 July 31, 2013 – Announced his retirement.

See also
Slovaks in the NHL

References

External links

 
 
 
 

1972 births
Living people
Czechoslovak ice hockey right wingers
HK Dukla Trenčín players
HC Slavia Praha players
HK 36 Skalica players
Ice hockey players at the 1994 Winter Olympics
Ice hockey players at the 2002 Winter Olympics
Ice hockey players at the 2010 Winter Olympics
IIHF Hall of Fame inductees
Los Angeles Kings players
National Hockey League All-Stars
New York Islanders draft picks
New York Islanders players
Olympic ice hockey players of Slovakia
Sportspeople from Skalica
Pittsburgh Penguins players
Salt Lake Golden Eagles (IHL) players
Slovak ice hockey right wingers
Slovak people of Hungarian descent
Slovak expatriate ice hockey players in the United States
Slovak expatriate ice hockey players in the Czech Republic